House of Manson (also known as Manson in the United Kingdom) is a 2014 biographical film that was written and directed by Brandon Slagle. It had its world premiere on October 18, 2014 at the Twin Cities Film Festival and stars Ryan Kiser as Charles Manson.

Synopsis 
The film details the life of Charles Manson, leading up to the murder of actress and model Sharon Tate and subsequent trial and sentencing.

Cast 
Ryan Kiser as Charlie
Devanny Pinn as Susan Atkins
Julie Rose as Leslie Van Houten
Reid Warner as Tex Watson
Serena Lorien as Patricia Krenwinkel
Tristan Risk as Abigail Folger
Max Wasa as Rosemary LaBianca
Suzi Lorraine as Sharon Tate
Tawny Amber Young as Rosalie Willis
Erin Marie Hogan as Linda Kasabian
Caitlin Kazepis as Gypsy Share
Jennifer Woods as Terry's Girlfriend
Trish Cook as Kathleen Maddox
Brandon Slagle as Uncle Maddox
Dillon Paigen as Steven Parent
Teresa R. Parker as Officer Orr (as Teresa Parker)

Reception 
Dread Central gave House of Manson a favorable review, writing that it was "informative, violent, shocking, and saddening – Slagle should be applauded for taking on a subject that’s been beaten to death and giving it a totally new perspective from the audience’s point of view."  Shock Till You Drop also gave a positive review, citing its acting and praising it for being "one of the few true-crime biopic indie films to roll out in a long time that doesn’t feel like simply an excuse to make a  film, cashing in on the name". Starburst was mildly more mixed, stating that it "won't offer any new insights or conclusions but it does present a different slant on a character whose infamy shows no sign of abating. Slagle's film is of interest though, built on excellent performances and subtle, almost documentary-like direction that draws the viewer in."

External links

References

2014 films
2010s biographical films
American biographical films
Biographical films about criminals
2010s English-language films
2010s American films